FPTV (short for Festival Portuguese Television) is a Canadian Category B Portuguese language specialty channel. The channel's licensee is 1395047 Ontario Inc., a company founded by Frank Alvarez, in 2001.

FPTV broadcasts a variety of foreign and locally produced programs aimed at the Portuguese speaking communities in Canada from Portugal, Brazil, and Portugal's former African Colonies. Programs include sports, news, telenovelas, and more. The majority of foreign programs are sourced from SIC Internacional, one of the most popular private networks in Portugal.

History
In November 2000, Frank Alvarez was granted approval from the Canadian Radio-television and Telecommunications Commission (CRTC) to launch Festival Portuguese Television, described at the time as ''"a national ethnic Category 2 specialty television service targeting the Portuguese community, of which a significant source of foreign programming will be SIC International."

The channel launched on September 7, 2001 on Rogers Cable in parts of Ontario.

References

External links
 
 SIC Internacional 

Brazilian Canadian
Digital cable television networks in Canada
Multicultural and ethnic television in Canada
Television channels and stations established in 2001
Portuguese-Canadian culture